Simple Things Remixes is a remix album by Zero 7, released only in the United States. It features mixes of tracks from their first album, Simple Things and an enhanced music video for the 2001 single "Destiny".

Track listing

References

External links
 Zero 7 official website
 
 
 

Zero 7 albums
2003 remix albums